Chanel Chance is a line of fragrances for women from Chanel that was introduced in September 2002. It was created by Jacques Polge, who has created every Chanel fragrance launched since 1978, including Coco Mademoiselle, Allure, Bleu de Chanel and Chanel No.5 Eau Premiere.

Unlike all other Chanel fragrances, which are square-shaped bottles packaged in black and white or beige, the Chance bottles are circular and packaged in different colors. The line consists of Chance Eau de Toilette, Chance Parfum, Chance Eau de Parfum, Chance Eau Fraiche, Chance Eau Tendre and Chance Eau Vive.

Chance Eau de Toilette, Parfum and Eau de Parfum
Chance Eau de Toilette is the first fragrance in the line. It is a floral scent, the top notes of which include citron and pink pepper, the heart notes - jasmine absolute, iris absolute and hyacinth; the base notes - amber patchouli, white musk and vetiver. Chance Parfum was released the same year, right after Chance Eau de Toilette. Its top notes consist of ambrette, citron, jasmine absolute; the heart notes are iris absolute, hyacinth. White musk, amber patchouli, fresh vetiver and vanilla belong to the base notes. Chance Eau de Parfum was released in 2005 and it is also floral with the same notes as in Chance Parfum.

Chance Eau Fraiche
Chance Eau Fraiche, first marketed in 2007, comes from a floral family. Its top notes include citron and pink pepper; the heart notes are composed of iris absolute, jasmine absolute and hyacinth; the base notes are white musk, amber patchouli, vetiver and teak wood.

Chance Eau Tendre
Chance Eau Tendre, concentration of which is ‘eau de toilette’, was first launched in 2010. It is a floral scent, top notes of which are based on grapefruit and quince; iris absolute and hyacinth are included in the heart notes; the base notes consist of amber, white musk, cedar wood.
 
In 2019 Chanel launched a new fragrance - Chance Eau Tendre Eau de Parfum. A new ‘Chance’ was created by Olivier Polge, the son of Jacques Polge. The new version of the fragrance is more intense and feminine. The floral heart is formed by exotic absolute jasmine, rose essence and creamy musk. It is also complemented by grapefruit and quince notes.

Chance Eau Vive
This floral scent with ‘eau de toilette’ concentration was released in 2015. It was created by perfumer Olivier Polge. The top notes of Chance Eau Vive are composed of grapefruit and orange, the heart notes – jasmine and musk, the base notes - vetiver, cedar, iris.

Advertising
The French fashion house's ‘Chance Eau Vive’ advertisement was created by the French graphic designer Jean-Paul Goude, who has worked with the brand since 1990. He has collaborated with such fragrance campaigns as Egoiste, Coco, Eau Vive and No.5 and with other brands including Kenzo and Shiseido.

The commercial shows models, dressed in pastel sweaters, crop tops and hoop skirts, Cindy Bruna, Romy Schonberger, Rianne van Rompaey and Sigrid Agren bowling where the pins and balls are perfume bottles. The individual shots, in which the models are seen through oversized and transparent bottles covering their faces, were also photographed by Goude.
For the Chance Eau Tendre Eau de Parfum campaign 2019, Jean-Paul Goude partnered with choreographer Ryan Heffington, musician Sam Spiegel and models Abby Champion, Camille Hurel, Rianne Van Rompaey and Ysaunny Brito. The video depicts these four models performing a choreographed dance at an audition because they have been chosen to take part in the campaign.

References

Chanel perfumes
Perfumes